John Steven Rivera Murillo (born 23 February 1992) is a Colombian footballer who currently plays for Universitario Popayán of the Categoría Primera B.

References

External links
 
 
 

1992 births
Living people
Colombian footballers
Colombian expatriate footballers
América de Cali footballers
Ñublense footballers
Jaguares de Córdoba footballers
Universitario Popayán footballers
Primera B de Chile players
Expatriate footballers in Chile
Association football midfielders
Footballers from Cali